Muhammad Naseem Rao  is a veteran & well known Pakistani labour leader born in influential family of Sindh on 12 April 1962 at Nabisar Road Tehsil Kunri, District Umerkot Sindh

Biography 
He is the elected Central General Secretary of the Pakistan's oldest & 2nd largest industry-wise union namely Railway Worker’s Union (Open Line), representing more than 90,000 workers all over in Pakistan. RWU is working since 1948 after partition of sub-continent. It is an affiliated with International Transport Workers’ Federation (ITF), a global union federation.

He is also a Central President of Pakistan Transport & General Workers' Federation, it is the largest federation of Pakistan in transport sector.

Education 
He is a highly qualified person with master's degrees in Economics & Law. He did Masters in Economics from Sindh University Jamshoro & LL.B from Karachi University.

Trade union career 
1982, he started his political activities from the platform of student union. In this tenure, he also participated in left-wing movement. In 1986, he joined trade union being as an activist. He is working in trade union movement since 1986. He has honour to work with the founder of Labour Movement in Sub-Continent Mr. Mirza Mohammad Ibrahim (Late).
He has honor to represent Pakistan at International Conferences, Seminar in different countries.

He has also an honor to represent railway workers before Senate Standing Committee on Railways, First time in the history of Pakistan any Labour Leader called by Senate of Pakistan to listen worker's issues.

Awards 
On 1 May 2009, World Labour Organisation (WLO) London awarded him Mirza Mohammad Ibrahim Yaadgari Award on his hard work & non-stop effort in labour movements at national & international level.

References

Web content 
 Online Legal Advice – Leading News Resource of Pakistan. Web. <http://legaladvicepk.com/unions-oppose-privatization-of-pakistan-railways-demand-end-of-political-interference-5231.html>.
 Daily Express – Leading News Resource of Pakistan. Web. <http://www.express.com.pk/epaper/PoPupwindow.aspx?newsID=1100898273&Issue=NP_KHI&Date=20100401.>.
 Pakistani Globe – News Resource <http://pakistaniglobe.blogspot.com/2011/01/protest-demo-held-against-downsizing.html>.
 Monthly Amami Jamhoriat Column. <http://may11.aj-pak.org/gpage9.html>.
 International The News Pakistan – Leading Newspaper. <http://www.thenews.com.pk/Todays-News-6-73375-Workers-union-warns-of-labour-unrest-in-railways>.
 International Transport Workers' Federation: Restructuring of the railway industry in Pakistan – Preparing unions to influence the process <https://web.archive.org/web/20110724155219/http://www.itfglobal.org/railways/unionreports-issue10.cfm>
 Dawn News – Call to bring back railway on track. <http://dawn.com/2011/03/25/call-to-bring-back-railway-on-track/>.
 Dawn News – Railway unions to stop trains if workers sacked<http://dawn.com/2011/01/15/railway-unions-to-stop-trains-if-workers-sacked/>.
 Workers to resist PR privatisation. <http://dawn.com/2012/02/17/workers-to-resist-pr-privatisation-2/>.
 Proposals submitted to resolve Railways crises | The Nation https://web.archive.org/web/20120626025121/http://www.nation.com.pk/pakistan-news-newspaper-daily-english-online/business/21-Mar-2010/Proposals-submitted-to-resolve-Railways-crises
 Staying on track : Railway workers demand Rs40b bailout package http://labourwatchpakistan.com/?p=2883
 Rail workers reject privatization of trains, demand transparency in PR affairs | Pakistan News 

Living people
1962 births
Pakistani trade unionists
University of Karachi alumni
University of Sindh alumni